Glomulin is a protein that in humans is encoded by the GLMN gene.

This gene encodes a phosphorylated protein that is a member of a Skp1-Cullin-F-box-like complex. The protein is essential for normal development of the vasculature and mutations in this gene have been associated with glomuvenous malformations, also called glomangiomas. Alternatively spliced variants that encode different protein isoforms have been described but the full-length nature of only one has been determined.

Interactions
GLMN has been shown to interact with FKBP4, C-Met and FKBP1A.

References

Further reading